Prophalangopsis obscura is an winged insect species found in North India and the Tibetan Plateau. It is one of only a few surviving species in the family Prophalangopsidae.  F. Walker described it in 1869 from a single male specimen from India. Liu et al collected two possible female specimens in 2009.

Bioacoustic modeling
In 2022, researchers attempted to recreate the call that P. obscura would make with its legs by using 3D scanning, microscopy, and a Laser Doppler vibrometer.

Gallery

Notes

References

External links

Ensifera
Insects described in 1869